Colombia competed in the 2019 Pan American Games in Lima, Peru from July 26 to August 11, 2019.

The Colombian team consisted of 349 athletes, the largest in history.

During the opening ceremony of the games, boxer Yuberjen Martínez carried the flag of the country as part of the parade of nations.

Medalists

The following Colombian competitors won medals at the games.

|  style="text-align:left; width:78%; vertical-align:top;"|

|  style="text-align:left; width:26%; vertical-align:top;"|

 -->

Competitors
The following is the list of number of competitors (per gender) participating at the games per sport/discipline.

Archery

Men

Women

Mixed

Badminton

Colombia received a reallocated quota spot for a female athlete.

Women

Baseball

Colombia qualified a men's team of 24 athletes by finishing in the top four at the 2019 Pan American Games Qualifier in Brazil.

Group B

Beach volleyball
Colombia qualified a women's pair.

Women
1 Pair (2 athletes)

Bodybuilding

Colombia qualified a full team of two bodybuilders (one male and one female).

There were no results in the pre-judging stage, with only the top six advancing.

Bowling

Boxing

Colombia qualified 12 boxers (eight men and four women).

Men

Women

  Jessica Caicedo, of Colombia, lost the gold medal due to doping violation.

Canoeing

Sprint

Men

Women

Qualification legend: QF – Qualify to final; SF – Qualify to semifinal

Diving

Men

Women

Equestrian

Colombia qualified a full team of 12 equestrians (four per discipline).

Dressage

Eventing

Jumping

Fencing

Colombia qualified a team of 13 fencers (seven men and six women).

Men
Épée – 1 quota
Foil – 3 quotas 
Sabre – 3 quotas

Women
Foil – 3 quotas 
Sabre – 3 quotas

Football

Colombia qualified a women's team (of 18 athletes) by finishing in one of the three qualification spots at the 2018 Copa América Femenina.

Summary

Women's tournament

Group A

Semifinal

Gold medal match

Golf

Colombia qualified a full team of four golfers (two men and two women).

Gymnastics

Trampoline
Colombia qualified a team of two gymnasts in trampoline (one man and one woman).

Men
1 quota

Women
1 quota

Modern pentathlon

Colombia qualified two modern pentathletes (one man and one woman).

Men
1 quota

Women
1 quota

Racquetball

Colombia qualified five racquetball athletes (two men and three women).

Racquetball

Colombia qualified four racquetball athletes (two men and two women).

Men

Women

Rugby sevens

Women's tournament

Pool stage

Semifinal

Bronze medal match

Sailing

Men

Open

Shooting

Men

Women

Squash

Colombia qualified a full team of 6 athletes through the 2018 Pan American Squash Championships.

Men

Women

Mixed

Surfing

Colombia qualified three surfers (two men and one women) in the sport's debut at the Pan American Games.

Artistic

Race

Table tennis

Men

Women

Mixed

Taekwondo

Kyorugi (sparring)
Men

Women

Tennis

Men

Women

Mixed

Volleyball

Colombia qualified a women's team (of 12 athletes) by winning finishing in the top five at the 2018 Women's Pan-American Volleyball Cup.

Summary

Women's tournament 

Group stage

Semifinal

Gold medal match

Water skiing

Colombia qualified four water skiers (two of each gender) and two wakeboarders (one of each gender).

Water skiing
Men

Women

Wakeboarding

Weightlifting

Colombia qualified a full team of 12 weightlifters (six man and six women).

Men

Women

Wrestling

Men

Women

References

Nations at the 2019 Pan American Games
2019
2019 in Colombian sport